Last Platoon is a 1988 Italian-American  Vietnam  war film  directed  by Ignazio Dolce (credited as Paul D. Robinson) and starring Richard Hatch.

Plot
After a war hero's Vietnamese girlfriend vanishes he accepts a risky mission to blow up a bridge at the Vietnamese border and he is given a group of prisoners to accompany him.

Cast 
Richard Hatch as Costa
Donald Pleasence as  Colonel B. Abrams 
Vassili Karis  
 Milene Thy-Sanh  
 Anthony Sawyer  
 Mike Monty

References

External links

1980s war films
Macaroni Combat films
English-language Italian films
Vietnam War films
1980s English-language films
1980s Italian films